Ayahuasca is a South American psychoactive and entheogenic brewed drink traditionally used both socially and as a ceremonial or shamanic spiritual medicine among the indigenous peoples of the Amazon basin, and more recently in Western society. The tea causes altered states of consciousness often known as "psychedelic experiences" which include visual hallucinations and altered perceptions of reality.

Ayahuasca is commonly made from the Banisteriopsis caapi vine, the Psychotria viridis shrub or a substitute, and other ingredients including Justicia pectoralis, one of the Brugmansia (especially Brugmansia insignis and Brugmansia versicolor, or a hybrid breed) or Datura species, and mapacho (Nicotiana rustica). 

A chemically similar preparation, sometimes called "pharmahuasca", can be prepared using N,N-Dimethyltryptamine (DMT) and a pharmaceutical monoamine oxidase inhibitor (MAOI), such as moclobemide or isocarboxazid.

Internationally, the Convention on Psychotropic Substances lists the active ingredient DMT as a schedule 1 drug, but does not control the cultivation of plants from which it can be derived, similarly to the "legal grey area" position of psychedelic plants like peyote and other mescaline-containing cacti.

Nomenclature 
Ayahuasca is known by many names throughout Northern South America and Brazil.

Ayahuasca is the hispanicized (traditional) spelling of a word in the Quechuan languages, which are spoken in the Andean states of Ecuador, Bolivia, Peru, and Colombia—speakers of Quechuan languages who use the modern Alvarado orthography spell it ayawaska. This word refers both to the liana Banisteriopsis caapi, and to the brew prepared from it. In the Quechua languages, aya means "spirit, soul", or "corpse, dead body", and waska means "rope" or "woody vine", "liana". The word ayahuasca has been variously translated as "liana of the soul", "liana of the dead", and "spirit liana". It is also referred to as "la purge" due to the belief that it cures the soul, offering a deep introspective journey that allows the user to examine their emotions and ways of thinking.

In Brazil, the brew and the liana are informally called either caapi or cipó; the latter is the Portuguese word for liana (or woody climbing vine). In the União do Vegetal of Brazil, an organised spiritual tradition in which people drink ayahuasca, the brew is prepared exclusively from B. caapi and Psychotria viridis. Adherents of União do Vegetal call this brew hoasca or vegetal; Brazilian Yawanawa call the brew "uní".

The Achuar people and Shuar people of Ecuador and Peru call it natem, while the Sharanahua peoples of Peru call it shori.

History 

Evidence of ayahuasca use dates back at least 1,000 years, as demonstrated by a bundle containing the residue of ayahuasca ingredients and various other preserved shamanic substances in a cave in southwestern Bolivia, discovered in 2010.

In the 16th century, Christian missionaries from Spain first encountered indigenous western Amazonian basin South Americans using ayahuasca; their earliest reports described it as "the work of the devil". In 1905, the active chemical constituent of B. caapi was named telepathine, but in 1927, it was found to be identical to a chemical already isolated from Peganum harmala and was given the name harmine. Beat writer William S. Burroughs read a paper by Richard Evans Schultes on the subject and while traveling through South America in the early 1950s sought out ayahuasca in the hopes that it could relieve or cure opiate addiction (see The Yage Letters). Ayahuasca became more widely known when the McKenna brothers published their experience in the Amazon in True Hallucinations. Dennis McKenna later studied pharmacology, botany, and chemistry of ayahuasca and oo-koo-he, which became the subject of his master's thesis.

Richard Evans Schultes allowed Claudio Naranjo to make a special journey by canoe up the Amazon River to study ayahuasca with the South American Indians. He brought back samples of the beverage and published the first scientific description of the effects of its active alkaloids.

In Brazil, a number of modern religious movements based on the use of ayahuasca have emerged, the most famous being Santo Daime and the União do Vegetal (or UDV), usually in an animistic context that may be shamanistic or, more often (as with Santo Daime and the UDV), integrated with Christianity. Both Santo Daime and União do Vegetal now have members and churches throughout the world. Similarly, the US and Europe have started to see new religious groups develop in relation to increased ayahuasca use. Some Westerners have teamed up with shamans in the Amazon forest regions, forming ayahuasca healing retreats that claim to be able to cure mental and physical illness and allow communication with the spirit world.

In recent years, the brew has been popularized by Wade Davis (One River), English novelist Martin Goodman in I Was Carlos Castaneda, Chilean novelist Isabel Allende, writer Kira Salak, author Jeremy Narby (The Cosmic Serpent), author Jay Griffiths (Wild: An Elemental Journey), American novelist Steven Peck, radio personality Robin Quivers, and writer Paul Theroux (Figures in a Landscape: People and Places).

Preparation 

Sections of Banisteriopsis caapi vine are macerated and boiled alone or with leaves from any of a number of other plants, including Psychotria viridis (chacruna), Diplopterys cabrerana (also known as chaliponga and chacropanga), and Mimosa tenuiflora, among other ingredients which can vary greatly from one shaman to the next. The resulting brew may contain the powerful psychedelic drug DMT and MAO inhibiting harmala alkaloids, which are necessary to make the DMT orally active. The traditional making of ayahuasca follows a ritual process that requires the user to pick the lower Chacruna leaf at sunrise, then say a prayer. The vine must be "cleaned meticulously with wooden spoons" and pounded "with wooden mallets until it's fibre."

Brews can also be made with plants that do not contain DMT, Psychotria viridis being replaced by plants such as Justicia pectoralis, Brugmansia, or sacred tobacco, also known as mapacho (Nicotiana rustica), or sometimes left out with no replacement. This brew varies radically from one batch to the next, both in potency and psychoactive effect, based mainly on the skill of the shaman or brewer, as well as other admixtures sometimes added and the intent of the ceremony. Natural variations in plant alkaloid content and profiles also affect the final concentration of alkaloids in the brew, and the physical act of cooking may also serve to modify the alkaloid profile of harmala alkaloids.

The actual preparation of the brew takes several hours, often taking place over the course of more than one day. After adding the plant material, each separately at this stage, to a large pot of water, it is boiled until the water is reduced by half in volume. The individual brews are then added together and brewed until reduced significantly. This combined brew is what is taken by participants in ayahuasca ceremonies.

Traditional use 

The uses of ayahuasca in traditional societies in South America vary greatly. Some cultures do use it for shamanic purposes, but in other cases, it is consumed socially among friends, in order to learn more about the natural environment, and even in order to visit friends and family who are far away.

Nonetheless, people who work with ayahuasca in non-traditional contexts often align themselves with the philosophies and cosmologies associated with ayahuasca shamanism, as practiced among indigenous peoples like the Urarina of the Peruvian Amazon. Dietary taboos are often associated with the use of ayahuasca, although these seem to be specific to the culture around Iquitos, Peru, a major center of ayahuasca tourism.

In the rainforest, these taboos tend towards the purification of one's self—abstaining from spicy and heavily seasoned foods, excess fat, salt, caffeine, acidic foods (such as citrus) and sex before, after, or during a ceremony. A diet low in foods containing tyramine has been recommended, as the speculative interaction of tyramine and MAOIs could lead to a hypertensive crisis; however, evidence indicates that harmala alkaloids act only on MAO-A, in a reversible way similar to moclobemide (an antidepressant that does not require dietary restrictions). Dietary restrictions are not used by the highly urban Brazilian ayahuasca church União do Vegetal, suggesting the risk is much lower than perceived and probably non-existent.

Ceremony and the role of shamans 
Shamans, curanderos and experienced users of ayahuasca advise against consuming ayahuasca when not in the presence of one or several well-trained shamans.

In some areas, there are purported brujos (Spanish for "witches") who masquerade as real shamans and who entice tourists to drink ayahuasca in their presence. Shamans believe one of the purposes for this is to steal one's energy and/or power, of which they believe every person has a limited stockpile.

The shamans lead the ceremonial consumption of the ayahuasca beverage, in a rite that typically takes place over the entire night. During the ceremony, the effect of the drink lasts for hours. Prior to the ceremony, participants are instructed to abstain from spicy foods, red meat and sex. The ceremony is usually accompanied with purging which include vomiting and diarrhea, which is believed to release built-up emotions and negative energy.

Traditional brew 

Traditional ayahuasca brews are usually made with Banisteriopsis caapi as an MAOI, while dimethyltryptamine sources and other admixtures vary from region to region. There are several varieties of caapi, often known as different "colors", with varying effects, potencies, and uses.

DMT admixtures:
 Psychotria viridis (Chacruna) – leaves
 Diplopterys cabrerana (Chaliponga, Chagropanga, Banisteriopsis rusbyana) – leaves
 Psychotria carthagenensis (Amyruca) – leaves
 Mimosa tenuiflora (M. hostilis) - root bark

Other common admixtures:
 Justicia pectoralis
 Brugmansia (Toé)
 Nicotiana rustica (Mapacho, variety of tobacco)
 Ilex guayusa, a relative of yerba mate

Common admixtures with their associated ceremonial values and spirits:

Ayahuma bark: Cannon Ball tree. Provides protection and is used in healing susto (soul loss from spiritual fright or trauma).
Capirona bark: Provides cleansing, balance and protection. It is noted for its smooth bark, white flowers, and hard wood.
Chullachaki caspi bark (Brysonima christianeae): Provides cleansing to the physical body. Used to transcend physical body ailments.
Lopuna blanca bark: Provides protection. 
Punga amarilla bark: Yellow Punga. Provides protection. Used to pull or draw out negative spirits or energies. 
Remo caspi bark: Oar Tree. Used to move dense or dark energies.
Wyra (huaira) caspi bark (Cedrelinga catanaeformis): Air Tree. Used to create purging, transcend gastro/intestinal ailments, calm the mind, and bring tranquility. 
Shiwawaku bark: Brings purple medicine to the ceremony. 
Uchu sanango: Head of the sanango plants. 
Huacapurana: Giant tree of the Amazon with very hard bark.
Bobinsana: Mermaid Spirit. Provides major heart chakra opening, healing of emotions and relationships.

Non-traditional usage 
In the late 20th century, the practice of ayahuasca drinking began spreading to Europe, North America and elsewhere. The first ayahuasca churches, affiliated with the Brazilian Santo Daime, were established in the Netherlands. A legal case was filed against two of the Church's leaders, Hans Bogers (one of the original founders of the Dutch Santo Daime community) and Geraldine Fijneman (the head of the Amsterdam Santo Daime community). Bogers and Fijneman were charged with distributing a controlled substance (DMT); however, the prosecution was unable to prove that the use of ayahuasca by members of the Santo Daime constituted a sufficient threat to public health and order such that it warranted denying their rights to religious freedom under ECHR Article 9. The 2001 verdict of the Amsterdam district court is an important precedent. Since then groups that are not affiliated to the Santo Daime have used ayahuasca, and a number of different "styles" have been developed, including non-religious approaches.

Ayahuasca analogs 

In modern Europe and North America, ayahuasca analogs are often prepared using non-traditional plants which contain the same alkaloids. For example, seeds of the Syrian rue plant can be used as a substitute for the ayahuasca vine, and the DMT-rich Mimosa hostilis is used in place of chacruna. Australia has several indigenous plants which are popular among modern ayahuasqueros there, such as various DMT-rich species of Acacia.

The name "ayahuasca" specifically refers to a botanical decoction that contains Banisteriopsis caapi. A synthetic version, known as pharmahuasca, is a combination of an appropriate MAOI and typically DMT. In this usage, the DMT is generally considered the main psychoactive active ingredient, while the MAOI merely preserves the psychoactivity of orally ingested DMT, which would otherwise be destroyed in the gut before it could be absorbed in the body. In contrast, traditionally among Amazonian tribes, the B. Caapi vine is considered to be the "spirit" of ayahuasca, the gatekeeper, and guide to the otherworldly realms.

Brews similar to ayahuasca may be prepared using several plants not traditionally used in South America:

DMT admixtures:
 Acacia maidenii (Maiden's wattle) – bark *not all plants are "active strains", meaning some plants will have very little DMT and others larger amounts
 Acacia phlebophylla, and other Acacias, most commonly employed in Australia – bark
 Anadenanthera peregrina, A. colubrina, A. excelsa, A. macrocarpa
 Desmanthus illinoensis (Illinois bundleflower) – root bark is mixed with a native source of beta-Carbolines (e.g., passion flower in North America) to produce a hallucinogenic drink called prairiehuasca.

MAOI admixtures:
 Harmal (Peganum harmala, Syrian rue) – seeds
 Passion flower 
 synthetic MAOIs, especially RIMAs (due to the dangers presented by irreversible MAOIs)

Effects 

People who have consumed ayahuasca report having mystical experiences and spiritual revelations regarding their purpose on earth, the true nature of the universe, and deep insight into how to be the best person they possibly can.  Many people also report therapeutic effects, especially around depression and personal traumas.

This is viewed by many as a spiritual awakening and what is often described as a near-death experience or rebirth. It is often reported that individuals feel they gain access to higher spiritual dimensions and make contact with various spiritual or extra-dimensional beings who can act as guides or healers.

The experiences that people have while under the influence of ayahuasca are also culturally influenced. Westerners typically describe experiences with psychological terms like "ego death" and understand the hallucinations as repressed memories or metaphors of mental states. However, at least in Iquitos, Peru (a center of ayahuasca ceremonies), those from the area describe the experiences more in terms of the actions in the body and understand the visions as reflections of their environment, sometimes including the person who they believe caused their illness, as well as interactions with spirits.

Recently, ayahuasca has been found to interact specifically with the visual cortex of the brain. In one study, de Araujo et al. measured the activity in the visual cortex when they showed participants photographs. Then, they measured the activity when the individuals closed their eyes. In the control group, the cortex was activated when looking at the photos, and less active when the participant closed his eyes; however, under the influence of ayahuasca and DMT, even with closed eyes, the cortex was just as active as when looking at the photographs. This study suggests that ayahuasca activates a complicated network of vision and memory which heightens the internal reality of the participants.

It is claimed that people may experience profound positive life changes subsequent to consuming ayahuasca, by author Don Jose Campos and others.

Vomiting can follow ayahuasca ingestion; this is considered by many shamans and experienced users of ayahuasca to be a purging and an essential part of the experience, representing the release of negative energy and emotions built up over the course of one's life. Others report purging in the form of diarrhea and hot/cold flashes.

The ingestion of ayahuasca can also cause significant but temporary emotional and psychological distress. Excessive use could possibly lead to serotonin syndrome (although serotonin syndrome has never been specifically caused by ayahuasca except in conjunction with certain anti-depressants like SSRIs). Depending on dosage, the temporary non-entheogenic effects of ayahuasca can include tremors, nausea, vomiting, diarrhea, autonomic instability, hyperthermia, sweating, motor function impairment, sedation, relaxation, vertigo, dizziness, and muscle spasms which are primarily caused by the harmala alkaloids in ayahuasca. Long-term negative effects are not known.

A few deaths linked to participation in the consumption of ayahuasca have been reported. Some of the deaths may have been due to unscreened preexisting heart conditions, interaction with drugs, such as antidepressants, recreational drugs, caffeine (due to the CYP1A2 inhibition of the harmala alkaloids), nicotine (from drinking tobacco tea for purging/cleansing), or from improper/irresponsible use due to behavioral risks or possible drug to drug interactions.

Potential therapeutic effects 

There are potential antidepressant and anxiolytic effects of ayahuasca.
For example, in 2018 it was reported that a single dose of ayahuasca significantly reduced symptoms of treatment-resistant depression in a small placebo-controlled trial. More specifically, statistically significant reductions of up to 82% in depressive scores were observed between baseline and 1, 7 and 21 days after ayahuasca administration, as measured on the Hamilton Rating Scale for Depression (HAM-D), the Montgomery-Åsberg Depression Rating Scale (MADRS), and the Anxious-Depression subscale of the Brief Psychiatric Rating Scale (BPRS). Other placebo-controlled research has provided evidence that ayahuasca can help improve self-perceptions in those with social anxiety disorder.

Ayahuasca has also been studied for the treatment of addictions and shown to be effective, with lower Addiction Severity Index scores seen in users of ayahuasca compared to controls. Ayahuasca users have also been seen to consume less alcohol.

Both in vitro and in vivo experiments have shown the DMT component of ayahuasca may induce the production of new neurons in the hippocampus. Murine test subjects performed better on memory tasks compared to a control group. Future research may lead to treatments for psychiatric and neurological disorders.

Ayahuasca has been reported to have been successfully used to treat SUNCT, an excruciating headache disorder, and relieve the symptoms for three weeks at a time.

Chemistry and pharmacology 

Harmala alkaloids are MAO-inhibiting beta-carbolines. The three most studied harmala alkaloids in the B. caapi vine are harmine, harmaline and tetrahydroharmine. Harmine and harmaline are selective and reversible inhibitors of monoamine oxidase A (MAO-A), while tetrahydroharmine is a weak serotonin reuptake inhibitor (SRI).

This inhibition of MAO-A allows DMT to diffuse unmetabolized past the membranes in the stomach and small intestine, and eventually cross the blood–brain barrier (which, by itself, requires no MAO-A inhibition) to activate receptor sites in the brain. Without RIMAs or the non-selective, nonreversible monoamine oxidase inhibition by drugs like phenelzine and tranylcypromine, DMT would be oxidized (and thus rendered biologically inactive) by monoamine oxidase enzymes in the digestive tract.

Individual polymorphisms of the cytochrome P450-2D6 enzyme affect the ability of individuals to metabolize harmine. Some natural tolerance to habitual use of ayahuasca (roughly once weekly) may develop through upregulation of the serotonergic system. A phase 1 pharmacokinetic study on ayahuasca (as Hoasca) with 15 volunteers was conducted in 1993, during the Hoasca Project. A review of the Hoasca Project has been published.

The compound N,N-dimethyltryptamine (DMT) found in ayahuasca has been shown to be immunoregulatory by preventing severe hypoxia and oxidative stress in in vitro macrophages, cortical neurons, and dendritic cells by binding to the Sigma-1 receptor. In vitro co-treatment of monocyte derived dendritic cells with DMT and 5-MeO-DMT inhibited the production of pro-inflammatory cytokines IL-1β, IL-6, TNFα and the chemokine IL-8, while increased the secretion of the anti-inflammatory cytokine IL-10 by activating the Sigma-1 receptor.

Neurogenesis

Several studies have shown the alkaloids in the B. caapi vine promote neurogenesis. More specifically, in vitro studies showed that harmine, tetrahydroharmine and harmaline, stimulated neural stem cell proliferation, migration, and differentiation into adult neurons. In vivo studies conducted on the dentate gyrus of the hippocampus noted an increase in the proliferation of BrdU positive cells in response to 100 μg of 5-MeO-DMT injected intravenously in the adult mouse brain.

Legal status 

Internationally, DMT is a Schedule I drug under the Convention on Psychotropic Substances. The Commentary on the Convention on Psychotropic Substances notes, however, that the plants containing it are not subject to international control:

A fax from the Secretary of the International Narcotics Control Board (INCB) to the Netherlands Ministry of Public Health sent in 2001 goes on to state that "Consequently, preparations (e.g. decoctions) made of these plants, including ayahuasca, are not under international control and, therefore, not subject to any of the articles of the 1971 Convention."

Despite the INCB's 2001 affirmation that ayahuasca is not subject to drug control by international convention, in its 2010 Annual Report the Board recommended that governments consider controlling (i.e. criminalizing) ayahuasca at the national level. This recommendation by the INCB has been criticized as an attempt by the Board to overstep its legitimate mandate and as establishing a reason for governments to violate the human rights (i.e., religious freedom) of ceremonial ayahuasca drinkers.

Under American federal law, DMT is a Schedule I drug that is illegal to possess or consume; however, certain religious groups have been legally permitted to consume ayahuasca. A court case allowing the União do Vegetal to import and use the tea for religious purposes in the United States, Gonzales v. O Centro Espirita Beneficente Uniao do Vegetal, was heard by the U.S. Supreme Court on November 1, 2005; the decision, released February 21, 2006, allows the UDV to use the tea in its ceremonies pursuant to the Religious Freedom Restoration Act. In a similar case an Ashland, Oregon-based Santo Daime church sued for their right to import and consume ayahuasca tea. In March 2009, U.S. District Court Judge Panner ruled in favor of the Santo Daime, acknowledging its protection from prosecution under the Religious Freedom Restoration Act.

In 2017 the Santo Daime Church Céu do Montréal in Canada received religious exemption to use ayahuasca as a sacrament in their rituals.

Religious use in Brazil was legalized after two official inquiries into the tea in the mid-1980s, which concluded that ayahuasca is not a recreational drug and has valid spiritual uses.

In France, Santo Daime won a court case allowing them to use the tea in early 2005; however, they were not allowed an exception for religious purposes, but rather for the simple reason that they did not perform chemical extractions to end up with pure DMT and harmala and the plants used were not scheduled. Four months after the court victory, the common ingredients of ayahuasca as well as harmala were declared stupéfiants, or narcotic schedule I substances, making the tea and its ingredients illegal to use or possess.

In June 2019, Oakland, California, decriminalized natural entheogens. The City Council passed the resolution in a unanimous vote, ending the investigation and imposition of criminal penalties for use and possession of entheogens derived from plants or fungi. The resolution states: "Practices with Entheogenic Plants have long existed and have been considered to be sacred to human cultures and human interrelationships with nature for thousands of years, and continue to be enhanced and improved to this day by religious and spiritual leaders, practicing professionals, mentors, and healers throughout the world, many of whom have been forced underground."
In January 2020, Santa Cruz, California, and in September 2020, Ann Arbor, Michigan, decriminalized natural entheogens.

Intellectual property issues 
Ayahuasca has stirred debate regarding intellectual property protection of traditional knowledge. In 1986 the US Patent and Trademarks Office (PTO) allowed the granting of a patent on the ayahuasca vine B. caapi. It allowed this patent based on the assumption that ayahuasca's properties had not been previously described in writing. Several public interest groups, including the Coordinating Body of Indigenous Organizations of the Amazon Basin (COICA) and the Coalition for Amazonian Peoples and Their Environment (Amazon Coalition) objected. In 1999 they brought a legal challenge to this patent which had granted a private US citizen "ownership" of the knowledge of a plant that is well-known and sacred to many indigenous peoples of the Amazon, and used by them in religious and healing ceremonies.

Later that year the PTO issued a decision rejecting the patent, on the basis that the petitioners' arguments that the plant was not "distinctive or novel" were valid; however, the decision did not acknowledge the argument that the plant's religious or cultural values prohibited a patent. In 2001, after an appeal by the patent holder, the US Patent Office reinstated the patent, albeit to only a specific plant and its asexually reproduced offspring. The law at the time did not allow a third party such as COICA to participate in that part of the reexamination process. The patent, held by US entrepreneur Loren Miller, expired in 2003.

See also 
Icaro
Kambo
Mariri
Ibogaine

Notes

Explanatory notes

Citations

Further reading 

 Burroughs, William S. and Allen Ginsberg. The Yage Letters. San Francisco: City Lights, 1963. 
 Langdon, E. Jean Matteson & Gerhard Baer, eds. Portals of Power: Shamanism in South America. Albuquerque: University of New Mexico Press, 1992. 
 Shannon, Benny. The Antipodes of the Mind: Charting the Phenomenology of the Ayahuasca Experience. Oxford: Oxford University Press, 2002. 
 Taussig, Michael. Shamanism, Colonialism, and the Wild Man: A Study in Terror and Healing. Chicago: University of Chicago Press, 1986.

External links

 
Entheogens
Herbal and fungal hallucinogens
Indigenous culture of the Amazon
Mixed drinks
Polysubstance drinks